Christ The King Presbyterian Church is a Presbyterian Church in America (PCA) church, founded in 1995. It occupies the historic building of the former Prospect Congregational Church, located at 99 Prospect Street in Cambridge, Massachusetts near Central Square.

History
The historic church building was designed by Alexander Rice Esty and was constructed in 1851 for the First Evangelical Congregational Church in Cambridgeport (Prospect Congregational), a Reformed congregation gathered in 1827 by members of Lyman Beecher's Hanover Street Church in Boston. Beecher and William Augustus Stearns gave the dedicatory sermons in 1852. The church building was listed on the National Register of Historic Places in 1982. In 1985 the original congregation merged with another UCC congregation (North Avenue Congregational Church) to become North Prospect Union Church in Medford and the building stood vacant. In 1995 Christ the King Presbyterian Church (CTK), a Reformed congregation founded the previous year as a church plant, purchased the dormant church building.

Today
The congregation worships at 10:00 on Sunday mornings, offers youth and adult Sunday school classes, and has specialized ministries for men, women, music, the arts, community groups, and international missions. Christ the King is part of a network of city churches connected to Redeemer Presbyterian Church of New York, and is home to a Church Planting Center working to establish additional churches in New England. Recent church plants include congregations in Dorchester (2008), Newton (2010), Hanover (2011), Roslindale, Jamaica Plain/Roxbury and Somerville. The Newton congregation meets at St. Mary's Episcopal Church on Sunday evenings.

Gallery

See also
National Register of Historic Places listings in Cambridge, Massachusetts

References

External links
Christ The King Church Official Website
CTK Sermons online
Christ the King Church Planting Center
Manual of the First Evangelical Congregational Church in Cambridgeport: containing the history of the church... (Printed at the Riverside Press, 1870)

Churches completed in 1851
Churches on the National Register of Historic Places in Massachusetts
Presbyterian Church in America churches in Massachusetts
Churches in Cambridge, Massachusetts
National Register of Historic Places in Cambridge, Massachusetts
1995 establishments in Massachusetts